Vítězslav Novák's Májová symfonie, Op. 73 (May Symphony), also known as Jarní symfonie (Spring Symphony), was composed in 1943, during the German occupation of Czechoslovakia. It is a strongly patriotic choral symphony based in Karel H. Mácha's 1836 poem May, Novák's second contribution to the genre after his 1934 Autumn Symphony. Dedicated to Iosif Stalin as the liberator of Czechoslovakia, the symphony was premiered in Prague on 5 December 1945, seven months after the German defeat.

Structure

The composition consists of three movements:

Andante sostenuto
Andante
Alla marcia funebre

A typical performance takes around 60 minutes.

References

1943 compositions
Choral symphonies
Novak
Compositions by Vítězslav Novák